This is a list of women writers who were born in the Czech Republic or Czechoslovakia or whose writings are closely associated with those countries.

A
Madeleine Albright (1937–2022), American politician, non-fiction writer, autobiographer, writing in English
Hana Andronikova (1967–2011), novelist, short story writer

B
Božena Benešová (1873–1936), Czech poet, novelist, short story writer, playwright 
Alexandra Berková (1949–2008), novelist, short story writer, some works translated into English
 Zdeňka Bezděková (1907–1999), writer, philosopher and translator
 Anna Bolavá, (born 1981), novelist, poet
Tereza Boučková (born 1957), short story writer, playwright
Zuzana Brabcová (1959–2015), novelist

C
Marie Červinková-Riegrová (1854–1895), biographer, autobiographer, librettist
Zuzana Černínová z Harasova (1600–1654), letter writer

D
Radka Denemarková (born 1968), novelist, biographer
Dominika Dery (born 1975), poet, prose writer, memoirist, author of The Twelve Little Cakes

E
Helen Epstein (born 1947 in Prague), biographer, memoirist, essayist, author of Children of the Holocaust

H
Jiřina Hauková (1919–2005), poet, translator 
Eva Hauserová (born 1954), novelist, non-fiction writer, feminist
Iva Hercíková (1935–2007), novelist, screenwriter
Daniela Hodrová (born 1946), novelist, editor, literary researcher
Eva Hudečková (born 1949), novelist, screenwriter 
Petra Hůlová (born 1979), popular novelist

J
Jožka Jabůrková (1896–1942), journalist, non-fiction writer, translator
Milena Jesenská (1896–1944), journalist, columnist, editor, translator

K
Eva Kantůrková (born 1930), novelist, short story writer, essayist, diarist
Jakuba Katalpa (born 1979), novelist, short story writer
Věra Kohnová (1929–1942), child diarist, author of The Diary of Vera Kohnova
Eliška Krásnohorská (1847–1926), poet, librettist, children's writer, critic, feminist

L
Květa Legátová (1919–2012), novelist, short story writer, essayist
Věra Linhartová (born 1938), art historian, short story writer, children's writer, poet, sometimes writing in French
Helena Lisická (1930–2009), writer of fairy tales and legends
Lucie Lomová (born 1964), comics writer
Jarmila Loukotková (1923–2007), historical novelist, short story writer, children's writer, playwright

M
Marie Majerová (1882–1967), novelist, short story writer, children's writer
Heda Margolius Kovály (1919–2010), memoirist, novelist, some works translated into English
Libuše Moníková (1945–1998), novelist, playwright, essayist, writing in German

N
Božena Němcová (1820–1862), acclaimed novelist, writer of folk tales, author of The Grandmother
Bára Nesvadbová (born 1975), novelist, columnist, children's writer

P
Halina Pawlowská (born 1955), screenwriter, short story writer, journalist, television presenter
Iva Pekárková (born 1963 in Prague), Czech-language novelist, now living in New York 
Gabriela Preissová (1862–1946), playwright, short story writer
Lenka Procházková (born 1951), novelist, television screenwriter
Marie Pujmanová (1893–1958) Czech poet and novelist

R
Magdalena Dobromila Rettigová (1785–1845), remembered for her cookery book
Sylvie Richterová (born 1945), short story writer, poet, essayist, educator
Lenka Reinerová (1916–2008), German-language non-fiction writer, journalist, editor, memoirist, essayist

S
Zdena Salivarová (born 1933), novelist, living in Canada
Milada Součková (1898–1983), writer, literary historian, diplomat
Petra Soukupová (born 1982), author, playwright, screenwriter
Marie Šťastná (born 1981), poet
Bertha von Suttner (1843–1914), born in Prague, Austrian pacifist, novelist, Nobel Peace Prize winner
Eva Švankmajerová (1940–2005), surrealist artist, writer, poet  
Karolina Světlá (1830–1899), novelist, feminist

T
Jindra Tichá (born 1937), academic, short story writer, living in New Zealand
Kateřina Tučková (born 1980), best-selling novelist (works translated into English), non-fiction writer

U 

 Eli Urbanová (1922–2012), Esperantist, novelist, poet

V
Fan Vavřincová (1917–2012), screenwriter, novelist, short story writer
Božena Viková-Kunětická (1862–1934), novelist, short story writer, politician

W
Alena Wagnerová (born 1936), journalist, biographer
Magdalena Wagnerová (born 1960), short story writer, screenwriter

Z
Marketa Zinnerová (born 1942), novelist, screenwriter, children's writer
Anna Zonová (born 1962), novelist, short story writer

See also
List of Czech writers
List of women writers

References

-
Czech women writers, List of
Writers
Women writers, List of Czech